= Xiamen Post & Telecommunications Building =

Skyscraper under construction in Xiamen, China

Xiamen Post & Telecommunications Building (simplified Chinese: 厦门邮电大厦; traditional Chinese: 廈門郵電大廈; pinyin: Xiàmén Yoúdiàn Dàshà; Pe̍h-ōe-jī: Ē-mn̂g iû-tiān tāi-hā) is a 66-storey tall office skyscraper under construction at Hubin Road South and Xiahe Road in Xiamen, Fujian province, China. It will be 364 metres (1,194 ft) tall to the top of the spire and 249.7 metres (819 ft) without the spire. Construction has been suspended.
